Hawk Springs State Recreation Area is a public recreation area on Hawk Springs Reservoir, located  southeast of Hawk Springs and  north of La Grange in Goshen County, Wyoming. The state park occupies  of land on the reservoir's western shore and is managed by the Wyoming State Parks, Historic Sites & Trails Division.

Activities and amenities
The park has a boat ramp, picnicking area, and campsites. The reservoir is home to a great blue heron rookery, accessible by boat. Other area waterfowl include blue-winged and green-winged teals, gadwalls, wood ducks, and pintails. Largemouth bass, walleye, and channel catfish are found in the reservoir.

References

External links

Hawk Springs State Recreation Area Wyoming State Parks, Historic Sites & Trails
Hawk Springs State Recreation Area Brochure and Map Wyoming State Parks, Historic Sites & Trails

State parks of Wyoming
Protected areas of Goshen County, Wyoming
Protected areas established in 1987
1987 establishments in Wyoming
IUCN Category III